Chasselay is a commune in the Rhône department in eastern France. The village is located between Lyon and Villefranche-sur-Saône. It is a relatively rural community without a train station.

Main sights 
 Tata of Chasselay

Sports 
 GOAL FC football team based in Chasselay

Notable people 
 Guy Lassausaie, chef

See also
 Communes of the Rhône department

References

 
Communes of Rhône (department)
Lyonnais